Rosa's Cafe is an American authentic Tex-Mex fast-casual restaurant chain with beginnings in West Texas. Rosa's has expanded to 47 locations across Texas. Additionally, there are restaurants in Hobbs, New Mexico, and one franchised unit in Temecula, California. The restaurants are well known for their "Tuesdays Were Made for Tacos" promotion. 

The first Rosa's Cafe opened in San Angelo, Texas, in 1983. Rosa's Cafe was purchased by the Bobby Cox Companies in 1995.  The Bobby Cox Companies also owns the restaurant chains Taco Villa and Texas Burger, as well as several non-restaurant ventures.  Their signature dish is chicken and beef fajitas, and sour cream chicken enchiladas.

References

External links
Rosa's Cafe Home Page

Mexican restaurants in the United States
Restaurants in Texas
Restaurants established in 1983
1983 establishments in Texas
Companies based in Fort Worth, Texas
Tex-Mex restaurants